Statistics of the Mexican Primera División for the 1986–87 season.

Overview
It was contested by 21 teams, and Guadalajara won the championship.

C.F. Cobras de Querétaro was promoted from Segunda División.

In the season were two teams relegated to Segunda División: Cobras and León.

Teams

Group stage

Group 1

Group 2

Group 3

Group 4

Results

Playoff

References
Mexico - List of final tables (RSSSF)
Mexico 1986/87

Liga MX seasons
Mex
1986–87 in Mexican football